Black Warrant: Confessions of a Tihar Jailer is an Indian 2019 non-fiction book written by journalist Sunetra Choudhury and the former superintendent of Tihar Jail, Sunil Gupta. It traces some of the infamous criminals who served their time in the jail and were hanged. The book was published by Roli Books on 7 November 2019. The book shares controversial confessions of procedural lapses and corruption leading to a travesty of justice. It provides a step forward in a quest to understand the Indian prison system and provides fodder for further research into its corruption and injustices.

Reception
A review in The Financial Express called the book a "racy read" calling it "a must-read if they want a quick tutorial on the history of crime in Delhi in the past four decades."

Adaptation
In June 2020, it was announced that Vikramaditya Motwane will be adapting the book into a web series. The rights are jointly acquired by Motwane's production company Andolan Films and writer-journalist Josy Joseph's Confluence Media.

References

External links
Black Warrant at Roli Books

2019 Indian novels
Indian non-fiction books
Indian memoirs
Roli Books books